Brian J. O'Neill (born December 23, 1949) is a Republican Councilman representing the Tenth District on the City Council of Philadelphia, Pennsylvania. He has served since 1980.

Biography
O'Neill was first elected to Council in 1979, when he defeated incumbent Councilman Mel Greenberg on a campaign built on Greenberg's perceived apathy for the position. Additionally, he has served as the President of the National League of Cities.

He introduced the Philadelphia blunt ban in May 2006, which was adopted and signed by the mayor.

He is currently the Council's Minority Leader.

See also
List of members of Philadelphia City Council since 1952

References

External links
Councilman Brian J. O'Neill - 10th District

Living people
Philadelphia City Council members
Pennsylvania Republicans
1949 births
21st-century American politicians
20th-century American politicians
St. Joseph's Preparatory School alumni